Amaxia manora is a moth of the family Erebidae. It was described by Herbert Druce in 1906. It is found in the upper Amazon and Peru.

References

Moths described in 1906
Amaxia
Moths of South America